= John Steinfort Kedney =

American philosopher (1819–1911)

John Steinfort Kedney (February 12, 1819 – 1911) was an American philosopher.
